Setaria verticillata is a species of grass known by the common names hooked bristlegrass, rough bristle-grass and bristly foxtail. It is native to Europe, but it is known on most continents as an introduced species and often a noxious weed. It is a hardy bunchgrass which grows in many types of urban, cultivated, and disturbed habitat. It is a weed of many types of agricultural crops, growing in vineyards and fields. Herbicide-resistant strains have been noted.

This is an annual grass with decumbent or erect stems growing up to a meter long. The leaf blades are up to 25 centimeters long and have a long sheath around the stem. The inflorescence is a dense panicle up to 15 centimeters long which tapers at both ends. It contains many small spikelets and bristles. The bristles have tiny backwards-pointing barbs that help them hook onto clothing or animal fur, facilitating their dispersal.

Seeds of the grass are used to make beer in South Africa and porridge in Namibia. They have been used as a famine food in India.

References

External links
Jepson Manual Treatment
Grass Manual Treatment
Washington Burke Museum
Photo gallery

verticillata
Flora of Europe
Bunchgrasses of Europe